

Winners and nominees

1980s

1990s

2000s

2010s

Records 
 Most awarded actress: Adela Noriega, 4 times.
 Most nominated actress: Adela Noriega with 5 nominations.
 Most nominated actress without a win: Alma Delfina and Thelma Madrigal with 3 nominations.
 Actress who have won all nominations: Lucero, Paulina Goto and Livia Brito, 2 times.
 Youngest winner: Danna Paola, 14 years old.
 Youngest nominee: Anahí, 13 years old.
 Oldest winner: Verónica Merchant, 33 years old.
 Oldest nominees: Delia Casanova and Liliana Abud, 37 years old.
 Actress winning after short time:
 Adela Noriega by (María Isabel, 1998) and (El Privilegio de Amar, 1999), 2 consecutive years.
 Livia Brito by (Triunfo del amor, 2012) and (Abismo de pasión, 2013), 2 consecutive years.
 Actress winning after long time: Paulina Goto by (Niña de mi Corazón, 2011) and (Mi corazón es tuyo, 2015), 4 years difference.
 Actress was nominated in this category, despite having played as a main villain:
 Ana Colchero (Destino, 1991)
 Itatí Cantoral (De frente al sol, 1993)
 Esmeralda Pimentel (Cachito de cielo, 2013)
 Thelma Madrigal (La sombra del pasado, 2016)
Foreign winning actress:
 Ludwika Paleta from Poland
 Livia Brito from Cuba

References

External links 
TVyNovelas at esmas.com
TVyNovelas Awards at the univision.com

Young Lead Actress
Young
Young
Young
Awards established in 1985
Awards disestablished in 2019